Maurice El Mediouni, French El Médioni (born on 18 October 1928 in Oran, Algeria) is an  Algerian-Jewish pianist, composer and interpreter of Andalusian, rai, Sephardic and Arab music. He is one of the few living artists to have performed with artists such as Lili Labassi, Line Monty, Lili Boniche, Samy el Maghribi, and Reinette l’Oranaise. He is also a professional tailor and took up initially music as a hobby.

Born in the Jewish quarter of Oran, in a family of musicians. His uncle was the celebrated Messaoud El Mediouni, "Saoud l'Oranais" who died at the Sobibor concentration camp. He is sometimes regarded as the grandfather of Algerian pop music.

Following the Algerian war of independence he moved to Paris, France, where he worked as a tailor as well as occasionally backing Jewish singers, and in 1967 to Marseilles where he opened a clothing factory and took a break from his musical career, which he resumed in the 1980s. He is currently based in France and Israel, and can be caught live performing solo or with other Arab-French and Jewish-French artists, such as Mahmoud Fadl, the Klezmatics, as well as playing alongside musicians who had originally accompanied him nearly half a century earlier in Algeria and France.

His memoir, From Oran to Marseille, edited by Max Reinhardt (radio presenter) and translated by Jonathan Walton, was published by Repeater Books in 2017.

References

1928 births
French jazz pianists
French male pianists
Algerian pianists
French expatriates in Israel
Algerian emigrants to France
Algerian Jews
Living people
Musicians from Oran
21st-century pianists
21st-century French male musicians
French male jazz musicians